"Slow Motion" is an R&B and new jack swing song by American music group Color Me Badd from their debut album, C.M.B. (1991). It was released as the fifth single (fourth in North America) in May 1992. The song was remixed from the album version (which is more nuanced, and typical New Jack Swing) to add more funky elements to the music, and added a feature by Bootsy Collins for the single release. The song is about having sexual intercourse with a partner, and wanting to continue make love to them slowly all night long. 

The song peaked at No. 18 on the Billboard Hot 100 chart on June 13, 1992, and lasted 20 weeks on the chart. It reached No. 40 on the Canadian charts. The video received support on MTV, The Box, Friday Night Videos, and BET.

Critical reception

Larry Flick from Billboard wrote, "Color Me Badd gets down and dirty in this sexy midtempo romp, in which graphic lyrics read like an anthem for the sexually sensitive male. Sultry, provocative love song describes the ideal mate who wants to "love you slow, so morning don't come before I do." Sounds like yet another pop radio smash."

Track listings
US vinyl, 12, promo"
A1 Slow Motion (Freeze Frame Mix)	4:36
A2 Slow Motion (Main Mix 2)	4:36
A3 Slow Motion (Simplicity)	4:25
B1 Slow Motion (Originality)	4:25
B2 Slow Motion (No Drumplicity)	4:25
B3 Slow Motion (Instrumental)	4:36

US vinyl, 7"
A Slow Motion (Freeze Frame Mix)	4:36
B Slow Motion (Main Mix 2)	4:36

US CD, maxi"
1 Slow Motion (Freeze Frame Mix)	4:36
2 Slow Motion (Main Mix 2)	4:36
3 Slow Motion (Simplicity)	4:25
4 	Slow Motion (Originality)	4:25
5 	Slow Motion (No Drumplicity)	4:25
6 Slow Motion (Instrumental)	4:33
7 Slow Motion (Album Mix)	4:24

US CD, maxi, promo"'
1 Slow Motion (Freeze Frame Mix)	4:36
2 Slow Motion (Main Mix 2)	4:36
3 Slow Motion (Simplicity)	4:25
4 Slow Motion (Originality)	4:25
5 Slow Motion (No Drumplicity)	4:25
6 Slow Motion (Instrumental)	4:36
7 Slow Motion (LP Mix)	4:25

US cassette, single"
A Slow Motion (Freeze Frame Mix)	4:36
B Slow Motion (Main Mix 2)	4:36

Personnel
Engineer – Howie Tee, Michael Fossenkemper
Producer, Mixed By – Howie Tee
Written-By – Color Me Badd, Howard Thompson (6)

Charts

Weekly charts

Year-end charts

References 

1992 songs
1992 singles
Color Me Badd songs
Giant Records (Warner) singles
Songs written by Sam Watters